Luís Carlos Ventura Pinheiro (born 8 January 2000) is a Portuguese professional footballer who plays as a defender for Varzim.

Career statistics

Club

Notes

References

2000 births
Living people
People from Vila Viçosa
Portuguese footballers
Portugal youth international footballers
Association football defenders
Liga Portugal 2 players
S.L. Benfica B players
Varzim S.C. players
Sportspeople from Évora District